The Women's sprint competition at the 2021 UCI Track Cycling World Championships was held on 21 and 22 October 2021.

Results

Qualifying
The qualifying was started on 21 October at 13:18. The top eight riders advanced directly to the 1/8 finals; places 9 to 24 advanced to the 1/16 final.

1/16 finals
The 1/16 finals were started on 21 October at 14:10. Each heat winner advanced to the 1/8 finals.

1/8 finals
The 1/16 finals were started on 21 October at 14:49. Each heat winner advanced to the quarterfinals.

Quarterfinals
The quarterfinals were started on 21 October at 18:58. Matches were raced in a best-of-three format hereon; winners proceed to the semifinals.

Semifinals
The semifinals were started on 21 October at 19:24. Matches were raced in a best-of-three format hereon; winners proceeded to the final, losers to the bronze medal race.

Finals
The finals were started at 20:51. Matches were raced in a best-of-three format hereon.

References

Women's sprint